Anzin is a commune in the Nord department in northern France.

History
Anzin was once the centre of important coal mines of the Valenciennes basin belonging to the Anzin Company, the formation of which dates to 1717. The commune's first coal layer of the area in 1734. The company of the mines of Anzin (Compagnie des mines d'Anzin) was created in 1757. In 1884 these mines were visited by Émile Zola, who based his novel Germinal upon his observations.  At the beginning of the twentieth century, the metallurgical industries of the place were extensive, and included iron and copper founding and the manufacture of steam-engines, machinery, chain-cables and a great variety of heavy iron goods. There were also glass-works and breweries.

Population

Popular culture
Bertrand Tavernier directed his film Ça commence aujourd'hui in Anzin in 1999.

See also
Communes of the Nord department

Twin cities 
 : Masakin

References

 See Reed G. Geiger, The Anzin Coal Company, 1830–1833. Univ of Delaware Press, 1974.

Communes of Nord (French department)